Big black delta may refer to:

In music 
Big Black Delta, an American rock band
 Big Black Delta (album), a 2013 album by the band

Other 
Black triangle (UFO), another name for Unidentified Flying Objects